Moshers Mill is a ghost town in Gilead Township, Morrow County, in the U.S. state of Ohio.

History
Mosher's Mill, the first gristmill and sawmill in the area, was built by Asa Mosher in 1819.

References

Geography of Morrow County, Ohio
1819 establishments in Ohio
Populated places established in 1819
Ghost towns in Ohio